Ottobeuren (Swabian: Ottobeire, Medieval Latin: Ottobura) is a market town and municipality in Bavaria, Germany, located 11 km southeast of Memmingen near the A7. It is famous for Ottobeuren Abbey, situated next to the Basilica. The town is seat of a municipal association with Hawangen and Böhen.

The musicologist Manfred Hermann Schmid was born in Ottobeuren.

Twin towns — sister cities
Ottobeuren is twinned with:

  Norcia, Italy 
  Saint-Donat-sur-l'Herbasse, France
  Tenterfield, New South Wales, Australia

References

Unterallgäu